The Star was a sailing event on the Sailing at the 1936 Summer Olympics program in Firth of Kiel. Seven races were scheduled. 24 sailors, on 12 boats, from 12 nations competed.

Results 

DNF = Did Not Finish, DNS= Did Not Start, DSQ = Disqualified, SO = Sailed over
 = Male,  = Female

Daily standings

Conditions at the Outer Course 
All starts were scheduled for 10:30.
The position of the outercourse was in front of Schilksee were in 1972 the new Olympic center was used. So in 1936 a long distance sailing/towing to the racing area from the old Olympic harbor.

Notes

References 
 
 
 
 

Star
Star (keelboat) competitions